Urbana is a residential project in Indian metropolis of Kolkata (South). It is located in Anandapur.

See also
 List of tallest buildings in Kolkata
 List of tallest buildings in India
 List of tallest buildings and structures in the Indian subcontinent
 List of tallest buildings in the world

References

Buildings and structures in Kolkata